The New York Streets were a professional indoor football team based in the New York metropolitan area. They were owned by Corey Galloway and were members of the National Arena League (NAL) for the 2019 season. They played their home games at the Westchester County Center in White Plains, New York.

Despite multiple offers and pleas to continue, the Streets opted out of the 2020 season due to COVID.

History
In July 2018, the franchise was founded by Brooklyn businessman Corey Galloway, making him the first African-American owner of a New York-area professional sports team. They announced that they were members of the National Arena League (NAL), at a press conference in NYC. The NAL announced its approval of a New York City franchise for the 2019 season, added the Streets' logo to their team list on December 17, and officially announced the team on December 18. 

The team announced they would play most of their home games at Westchester County Center in White Plains, New York, with select games at Madison Square Garden. When they released their inaugural schedule, no games at Madison Square Garden were included, but the Streets did come to an agreement to have their home games aired on MSG Network.

2019 season
The Streets played their first game on April 13, 2019, a 52–41 win over the Jacksonville Sharks in Jacksonville. A week later, they played their first home game on April 20 against the Orlando Predators. There was, however, a problem: the playing area at Westchester County Center wasn't large enough for a regulation 50-yard field. So, the Streets had a custom-built field made with markings to make it appear to be 50 yards, but was actually only around 38 yards long. (The NAL was apparently unaware of the deception until it was pointed out by local media.) The Streets won, 70–31, and the team was allowed to keep their "short" field.

After splitting their next two contests, the Streets were 3–1 and atop the NAL standings. Then a series of injuries decimated the roster, and New York dropped eight straight going into their final home game on July 21 against the Carolina Cobras. Things did not improve for the Streets against Carolina; by halftime, they were trailing, 46–0. But matters were even worse for the Cobras: the visitor's locker room had been robbed, with several Cobras' players personal items stolen. Despite their big lead, Carolina refused to return to the field; later, a coproduction coordinator for the Streets was arrested for stealing approximately $3,000 in cash from the locker room, as well as swiping $1,000 the previous game from a Streets' cheerleader. A week later, the NAL fined the Streets for not providing adequate security but awarded New York a forfeit win due to the Cobras refusing to play, which the league viewed as detrimental to the public image of the league. The Streets then ended the season with a final 50–35 road loss to the Massachusetts Pirates on July 27 to finish with a 4–10 record.

Hiatus
In September 2019, the NAL announced it had merged with Champions Indoor Football for the 2020 season as a new league. The merger fell apart a month later. The season was ultimately cancelled due to the COVID-19 pandemic.

Personnel

Staff

Statistics

Season-by-season results

Head coaches
Note: Statistics are correct through the 2019 National Arena League regular season.

References
 14.https://www.nytimes.com/topic/organization/arena-football-league

External links
 Official website

National Arena League teams
2018 establishments in New York (state)
American football teams in New York City
American football teams in the New York metropolitan area
American football teams established in 2018
White Plains, New York
Sports in Westchester County, New York